Irving Convention Center station is a DART Light Rail station located in the Las Colinas development of Irving, Texas. The station opened in July 2012 and serves the Irving Convention Center and Las Colinas Urban Center. It briefly served as the Orange Line terminus until the North Lake College and Belt Line stations opened in December 2012.

Upon the launch of the Orange Line, there was no direct bus connection at the station. However, DART provided a nearby bus route (503) on Las Colinas Blvd. on a weekday basis. That all changed in December 2012 when a few of the routes were diverted to this station. Parking is provided, but at an existing parking lot at North Irving Transit Center. Access to the station platform is available via a walkway and pedestrian crossing under Northwest Highway.

As of the DART bus network redesign effective January 24, 2022, this station is served by DART Route  Monday-Sunday.

See also
 North Irving Transit Center

References

External links
Dallas Area Rapid Transit - Irving Convention Center Station

Dallas Area Rapid Transit light rail stations
Railway stations in the United States opened in 2012
Railway stations in Dallas County, Texas
Transportation in Irving, Texas